The following Union Army units and commanders fought in the Second Battle of Kernstown of the American Civil War, on July 24, 1864, in Kernstown, now part of the City of Winchester, Virginia.  The Confederate order of battle is shown separately.

Abbreviations used

Military rank
 MG = Major General
 BG = Brigadier General
 Col = Colonel
 Ltc = Lieutenant Colonel
 Maj = Major
 Cpt = Captain
 Lt = Lieutenant
 Bvt = Brevet Rank

Other
 w = wounded
 mw = mortally wounded
 k = killed

Army of West Virginia
BG George Crook

Cavalry

See also

 Second Battle of Kernstown

References
 Kernstown Battlefield Association

American Civil War orders of battle